New Trenton is an unincorporated community and census-designated place (CDP) in Whitewater Township, Franklin County, Indiana. As of the 2010 census it had a population of 252. It has a ZIP code 47035.

History
New Trenton was laid out in 1816. The community was named after Trenton, New Jersey, the native home of a share of the first settlers. The New Trenton post office was established in 1817.

Geography
U.S. Route 52 passes through the community, leading northwest (upriver)  to Brookville and southeast (downriver)  to Harrison, Ohio.

Demographics

Notable people
John Calvert, magician born in New Trenton

References

Census-designated places in Franklin County, Indiana
Census-designated places in Indiana